"Run to Me" is a song by the British rock band Smokie. It was released as a single in 1980 and was also included on the new Smokie greatest-hits albums issued in the same year (Smokie's Greatest Hits Volume 2 in continental Europe and Australia and The Very Best of Smokie — 14 Hit Singles in the UK).

Background and writing 
The song was written by Chris Norman and Smokie drummer Pete Spencer and produced by Smokie.

Commercial performance 
The Smokie song by Smokie reached no. 29 in Germany.

Savoy Brown version 

English blues rock band Savoy Brown released their cover as a single in 1981. It was featured as the sole studio track on that year's Greatest Hits Live in Concert album.  It also appeared on German editions of the band's Rock 'N' Roll Warriors album, released the same year.

It became Savoy's highest-charting single in the United States, peaking at number 68 on the Billboard Hot 100 on the week of October 31, 1981.

Charts

Smokie version

Savoy Brown version

References

External links 

 Smokie – "Run to Me" (1980) at Discogs
 Smokie - Smokie's Greatest Hits Volume 2 at Discogs
 Smokie - The Very Best Of Smokie at Discogs

1980 songs
1980 singles
Smokie (band) songs
Songs written by Chris Norman
RAK Records singles
Savoy Brown songs